Colin Bailey may refer to:

 Colin Bailey (drummer) (1934–2021), British-born American jazz drummer
 Colin Bailey (engineer) (born 1967), British structural engineer
 Drums of Death (musician), real name Colin Bailey, British electronic musician
 Colin Bailey (police officer) (born 1943), British constable
 Colin Bailey (mountain biker) (born 1979), American cyclist in the 1999 UCI Mountain Bike World Cup
 Colin B. Bailey, British–American museum director